Little Blue River is a  stream in Jackson County, Missouri, United States, that gave its name to the Battle of Little Blue River during the American Civil War.  It rises in the southern Jackson County town of Grandview and empties into the Missouri River just west of the town of Sibley.  The Little Blue was named for its smaller size relative to nearby Blue River. 

At Lake City, MO, the river has a mean annual discharge of 167 cubic feet per second.

Longview Lake is a  freshwater reservoir created by damming the river.

Location

Mouth Confluence with the Missouri River in Jackson County, Missouri: 

Source Cass County, Missouri:

See also
List of Missouri rivers

References

Rivers of Missouri
Tributaries of the Missouri River
Rivers of Jackson County, Missouri